Lucknow Upnagariya Parivahan Sewa is a suburban bus service of  Uttar Pradesh State Road Transport Corporation which operates primarily in the city of Lucknow, suburban towns and tehsils of Lucknow district and neighbouring districts.

Operations
These buses cater the need of suburban towns and tehsils in Lucknow and neighbouring districts. Suburban services originates from Charbagh and Kaiserbagh. Towns connected by Charbagh are Barabanki city, Nigohan, Nayi Jail, Nagram, Mohanlalganj, Subeha, Purwa, Maurawan, Bachhrawan, Maharaj Ganj and Harchandpur. Towns connected by Kaiserbagh are Malihabad, Itaunja, Mahmudabad, Amaniganj, Haidergarh, Nayi Jail.  It is a division of Uttar Pradesh State Road Transport Corporation.

See also
 Lucknow City Transport Services

References

External links 
Official website of UPSRTC

Transport in Lucknow
State road transport corporations of India
State agencies of Uttar Pradesh
Metropolitan transport agencies of India
2005 establishments in Uttar Pradesh